Richard Bristowe may refer to:

 Richard Bristow (1538–1581), English Catholic controversialist and Biblical scholar
Richard Bristowe (MP) for Appleby